The 1945–46 Buffalo Bulls men's basketball team represented the University of Buffalo during the 1945–46 NCAA college men's basketball season. The head coach was Robert Harrington, coaching his first season with the Bulls.

Schedule

|-

References

Buffalo Bulls men's basketball seasons
Buffalo
Buffalo Bulls
Buffalo Bulls